Paul O. Zelinsky (born 1953) is an American illustrator and writer best known for illustrating children's picture books. He won the 1998 Caldecott Medal for U.S. picture book illustration, for Rapunzel. His most popular work is Wheels On the Bus, a best-selling movable book.

Zelinsky had been runner-up for the Caldecott Medal in 1985, 1987, and 1995, the latter for Swamp Angel by Anne Isaacs (Dutton, 1994). Twenty years later, they were joint runners-up for the Phoenix Picture Book Award from the Children's Literature Association, which annually recognizes the best picture book that did not win a major award 20 years earlier. "Books are considered not only for the quality of their illustrations, but for the way pictures and text work together."

Biography

Early life

Paul O. Zelinsky was born in Evanston, Illinois, and grew up in Wilmette. As a child, he spent much of his time drawing. With his friends, he would make up imaginary worlds, and draw them. When he was only four, he submitted work to Highlights magazine, and this is when his artwork was first showcased. Influential early childhood books included The Color Kittens, and The Tawny Scrawny Lion. About his memories of childhood reading, Zelinsky has said: "Feelings come to me as a sort of flavor. I know that when I call up my earliest memories, what I remember seeing and hearing is accompanied by a flavor-like sense of what it felt like to be there and see that." (This phenomenon is known as synesthesia.) In later childhood, his favorite authors were William Pène du Bois, and Robert Lawson. He especially loved the books The Twenty-One Balloons, by du Bois, and The Fabulous Flight by Lawson.

Career

At New Trier High School, Zelinsky was interested in natural history as well as architecture and saw himself following one of those paths for a career. However, he went to study at Yale. He took a class taught by Maurice Sendak on the history and art of children's books, and it inspired him to a career in the area. Zelinsky went to graduate school at the Tyler School of Art in Philadelphia and Rome. The Renaissance and Italian art always fascinated him, and this time in his life influenced this love as well. His career in children's books began in 1978 with the illustrations for Avi's Emily Upham's Revenge. Since then, he has continued to illustrate others' work, as well as creating his own books. He won the 1998 Caldecott Medal for his illustrated retelling of Rapunzel, and three Caldecott Honors (for Hansel and Gretel (1985), Rumpelstiltskin (1987), and Swamp Angel (1995)). His most popular book is Wheels On the Bus, which has sold millions.

Artistic style

Zelinsky does not have a recognizable style, suiting his artwork and techniques to the particular nature of the book to be illustrated. According to Linnea Lannon in a Detroit Free Press profile of the artist, "what has raised Zelinsky into the first rank of children's book illustrators is not just the pictures but the way they integrate with text." Zelinsky says, "I want the pictures to speak in the same voice as the words. This desire has led me to try various kinds of drawings in different books. I have used quite a wide stretch of styles, and I'm fortunate to have been asked to illustrate such a range of stories." Wheels On the Bus and Knick-Knack Paddywhack! are engineered books with moving parts. Zelinsky is not a paper engineer himself, Rodger Smith engineered Wheels On the Bus and Andrew Baron Knick-Knack Paddywhack!.

Books

As writer and illustrator
 The Maid and the Mouse and the Odd-Shaped House: A Story in Rhyme (1981) – adapted from a school exercise
 The Lion and the Stoat (Greenwillow Books, 1984) – based in part on natural history by Pliny the Elder 
 Rumpelstiltskin, retold (1986) – Brothers Grimm
 Wheels On the Bus, paper engineer Rodger Smith (Dutton, 1990) – adapted from the children's folk song ; "A Book with Parts that Move" — Cover 
 Rapunzel, retold (1997) – from the Brothers Grimm (1812)
 Knick-Knack Paddywhack!, paper engineer Andrew Baron (Dutton, 2002) – adapted from the nursery rhyme "This Old Man"; "A Moving Parts Book Adapted from the Counting Song" — Cover 

As illustrator
 Emily Upham's Revenge, or How Deadwood Dick Saved the Banker's Niece: A Massachusetts Adventure, written by Avi (Pantheon Books, 1978)
 How I Hunted the Little Fellows, Boris Zhitkov, transl. from Russian by Djemma Bider (Dodd, Mead, 1979)
 The History of Helpless Harry, to Which is Added a Variety of Amusing and Entertaining Adventures, Avi (1980)
 What Amanda Saw, Naomi Lazard (1981)
 Three Romances: Love Stories from Camelot Retold, Winifred Rosen (1981)
 Ralph S. Mouse, Beverly Cleary (1982)
 The Sun's Asleep Behind the Hill, Mirra Ginsburg (1982) – adapted from an Armenian song
 The Song in the Walnut Grove, David Kherdian (1982)
 Dear Mr. Henshaw, Beverly Cleary (1983)
 Zoo Doings: Animal Poems, Jack Prelutsky (1983)
 Hansel and Gretel, retold by Rika Lesser (1984)
 The Story of Mrs. Lovewright and Her Purrless Cat, Lore Segal (1985)
 The Random House Book of Humor for Children, selected by Pamela Pollack (1988)
 The Big Book for Peace, Myra Cohn Livingston (1990)
 Strider, Beverly Cleary (1991)
 The Enchanted Castle, E. Nesbit (1992; orig. 1907)
 More Rootabagas, posthumous collection by Carl Sandburg, ed. George Hendrick (1993)
 Swamp Angel, Anne Isaacs (Dutton Children's Books, 1994)
 Five Children and It, E. Nesbit (1999; orig. 1902)
 Awful Ogre's Awful Day, Jack Prelutsky (2000) – poems
 Doodler Doodling, Rita Golden Gelman (2004)
 Toys Go Out series, children's novels by Emily Jenkins, published by Schwartz & Wade 
 Toys Go Out: Being the Adventures of a Knowledgeable Stingray, a Toughy Little Buffalo, and Someone called Plastic (2006)
 Toy Dance Party: Being the Further Adventures of a Bossyboots Stingray, a Courageous Buffalo, and a Hopeful Round Someone called Plastic (2008)
 Toys Come Home: Being the Early Experiences of an Intelligent Stingray, a Brave Buffalo, and a Brand-New Someone called Plastic (2011)
  Toys Meet Snow: Being the Wintertime Adventures of a Curious Stuffed Buffalo, a Sensitive Plush Stingray, and a Book-Loving Rubber Ball (forthcoming 2015)
 The Shivers in the Fridge, Fran Manushkin (2006)
 Awful Ogre Running Wild, Jack Prelutsky (2008) – poems
 Dust Devil, Anne Isaacs (Random House/Schwartz & Wade, 2010) – sequel to Swamp Angel
Z is for Moose, Kelly Bingham (2012)
  Earwig and the Witch, Diana Wynne Jones (2012)
Circle, Square, Moose, Kelly Bingham (forthcoming 2014) – sequel to Z is for Moose

References

Further reading
 Llanas, Sheila Griffin (2012). Paul O. Zelinsky, Minneapolis, MN: ABDO Pub. Co., 24 pp., illustrated.

External links

 
 
 Biographical sketch from The Scoop
 Essay on Zelinsky and his work
 Exhibition notes: Angels to Ogres
 

1953 births
American children's book illustrators
American children's writers
Caldecott Medal winners
20th-century illustrators of fairy tales
21st-century illustrators of fairy tales
Living people